The cervical plexus is a plexus of the anterior rami of the first four cervical spinal nerves which arise from C1 to C4 cervical segment in the neck. They are located laterally to the transverse processes between prevertebral muscles from the medial side and vertebral (m. scalenus, m. levator scapulae, m. splenius cervicis) from lateral side. There is anastomosis with accessory nerve, hypoglossal nerve and sympathetic trunk. It is located in the neck, deep to the sternocleidomastoid muscle.
Nerves formed from the cervical plexus innervate the back of the head, as well as some neck muscles. The branches of the cervical plexus emerge from the posterior triangle at the nerve point, a point which lies midway on the posterior border of the sternocleidomastoid.

Branches
The cervical plexus has two types of branches: cutaneous and muscular.
Cutaneous (4 branches): 
Lesser occipital nerve - innervates the skin and the scalp posterosuperior to the auricle (C2)
Great auricular nerve - innervates skin near concha auricle (outer ear) and external acoustic meatus (ear canal) (C2&C3)
Transverse cervical nerve - innervates anterior region of neck (C2 and C3)
Supraclavicular nerves - innervate the skin above and below the clavicle (C3 and C4)  
Muscular
Ansa cervicalis (This is a loop formed from C1-C3 which supplies the four infrahyoid aka strap muscles), etc. (thyrohyoid (C1 only), sternothyroid, sternohyoid, omohyoid)
Phrenic (C3-C5 (primarily C4))-innervates thoracic diaphragm and the pericardium
Segmental branches (C1-C4)- innervates anterior and middle scalenes
Levator scapulae muscle (C3, C4), also by dorsal scapular nerve (C5) from Brachial plexus

Diagram

Additional images

References

External links
  - "Diagram of the cervical plexus"
 
 Diagram at msu.edu 

Nerve plexus
Spinal nerves
Nerves of the head and neck